Matthew Beveridge (born March 18, 1975) is a Canadian retired professional ice hockey player. Beveridge also used to coach for Lucas Miller's Hi-Performance Hockey in Brampton, Ontario.

Beveridge was born in Toronto, Ontario. Although drafted into the OHL by the Peterborough Petes, Beveridge's senior professional career was kick started with his move to the United Kingdom in 1996, where he would play for the Whitley Warriors, a team once coached by Mike Babcock.  At the British National League level, Beveridge would excel and in his first season totalled 100 points in just 36 games.

This productivity saw him move to Germany for the 1997/1998 term, which he would spend as an ESC Dorfen player in the German second division.  Once again Beveridge would score points easily, with 68 in just 50 games.  He would return to the U.K. the following season and would once again grace the BNL, although this time with the Peterborough Pirates.  His points ratio of greater than a point per game would help the Pirates into the post season.  A further move within the BNL would follow in the summer of 2000, this time to the Paisley Pirates.  Beveridge's productivity continued, this time with 48 points in 34 games.

Despite this, the Pirates failed to make the post-season and so Beveridge left for the Invicta Dynamos of the recently founded EPL.  Beveridge would spend three prolific seasons in Gillingham, scoring 252 points.  This prompted a chance at the higher BNL level again, with Beveridge moving north to the former ISL team the Newcastle Vipers.  Through the 2003/04 and 2004/05 seasons, Beveridge would again be a leading scorer for the Vipers.

As one of the leading BNL teams, the Vipers were invited to join the newly formed EIHL in 2005/06.  At this higher level, Beveridge would score 25 points in 44 games and was unable to match his previous scoring rate.  This led to the Vipers releasing him in the summer of 2006.  His signature was quickly snapped up by the Manchester Phoenix, icing in their debut season in the EIHL.  Beveridge would play just three games for the Phoenix however, before re-joining Newcastle mid-season.

He failed to settle however, despite scoring 5 points in the 9 games in which he featured and another mid-season move would follow, this time to the Sheffield Scimitars, the EPL team of the Sheffield Steelers organisation.  Beveridge would make just one appearance before moving on again however, this time to the Bracknell Bees, where he would total a remarkable 61 points in 24 games, a ratio of almost three points per game.

At the end of the 2006/07 season, Beveridge announced his retirement from the playing side of the sport, and returned home to Ontario.  Here he would find work as a coach for an ice hockey school in Brampton. He absolutely adores one of his kids.

Career stats

Includes league/post season games only, correct up to 15/01/09

External links

Lucas Miller Hockey School Staff Page, Lucas Miller's Hi-Performance Hockey Official Website
Matt Beveridge Profile, Sportsbase Website

1975 births
Living people
Bracknell Bees players
Canadian ice hockey forwards
Manchester Phoenix players
Newcastle Vipers players
Ice hockey people from Toronto
Whitley Warriors players
Canadian expatriate ice hockey players in England